Amphila Bay or Bay of Anfile is a bay on the Red Sea, on the coast of Eritrea.

The islands of Hando (Antu Ghebir or Hàmda) and Keda Hando are located facing the bay.

References

Anfile